Kenneth Michael Conaway (born June 11, 1948) is an American politician who was the U.S. representative for  from 2005 to 2021. He is a member of the Republican Party. The district Conaway represented is located in West Texas and includes Midland, Odessa, San Angelo, Brownwood, and Granbury. Conaway led the investigation into Russian interference in the 2016 United States elections (with assistance from Trey Gowdy and Tom Rooney) after the Intelligence Committee chair, Devin Nunes, recused himself. Aside from serving as the chair of the House Ethics Committee, he served as the chair of the House Agriculture Committee, and later its ranking member. Conaway indicated in July 2019 that he would not be seeking reelection. Conaway was succeeded by fellow Republican August Pfluger.

Background
Conaway was born in Borger in the Texas Panhandle northeast of Amarillo, the son of Helen Jean (McCormick) and Louis Denton Conaway. He graduated in 1966 from Permian High School in Odessa in Ector County, where he was a standout player for the Permian Panthers and a member of the first Permian State Championship team in 1965. After High School, he attended Ranger College on a football scholarship before attending Texas A&M University-Commerce (then named East Texas State University), lettering in Football for the Lions from 1966 to 1969 and was a member of two Lone Star Conference championship teams. He majored in Accounting, graduating in 1970.

Career

Military
Conaway served in the United States Army from 1970 to 1972.

Private sector
Conaway was an accountant and became a Certified Public Accountant in 1974, chief financial officer at a bank, and from 1981 to 1986 was the chief financial officer of Arbusto Energy Inc, an oil and gas exploration firm operated by George W. Bush.

Texas government
Soon after Bush was elected governor of Texas, he appointed Conaway to the Texas State Board of Public Accountancy, which regulates accountancy in Texas. He served on the board as a volunteer for seven years, the last five as chairman.

U.S. House of Representatives
Committee assignments (116th Congress)
 Committee on Agriculture (Ranking Member)
 Committee on Armed Services
 Subcommittee on Intelligence, Emerging Threats and Capabilities
 Subcommittee on Seapower and Projection Forces
 Permanent Select Committee on Intelligence
Caucus memberships
 CPA Caucus (Founder)
 International Conservation Caucus
 Reliable Energy Caucus
 Sportsmen's Caucus
Congressional Constitution Caucus
Congressional Western Caucus 
United States Congressional International Conservation Caucus

Tenure
Conaway endorsed former Massachusetts Governor Mitt Romney for president in 2008. On May 13, 2016, Conaway endorsed the Republican presumptive nominee Donald Trump for president in the 2016 U.S. presidential election.

In 2006, Conaway voted against extending the Voting Rights Act of 1965.

Conaway served on committees of the National Republican Congressional Committee (NRCC), the campaign arm of the House Republican caucus. 
In January 2007, Conaway began chairing the three-member audit committee for the NRCC. By January 28, 2008, Conaway had uncovered a fraud, where hundreds of thousands of dollars were missing from NRCC bank accounts, and supposed annual audits on the NRCC books had actually not been performed since 2001.

Conaway introduced legislation to extend and reform the federal tax credit to support wide scale commercial deployment of carbon capture and storage.

Speaker Paul Ryan announced Conaway's new role as leader of the House Intelligence Committee in April 2017 after chairman Devin Nunes temporarily recused himself from investigations into Russian interference in the U.S. 2016 election.

In February 2018, Conaway prevented efforts by the Democrats on the House Intelligence Committee to investigate financial links between Trump, his businesses, his family and Russian actors. Conaway prevented subpoenas for related bank records, Trump's tax returns and witnesses. Democrats on the committee had, for example, asked for subpoenas to Deutsche Bank, which the Trump Organization and Jared Kushner (Trump's son-in-law and senior White House advisor) have borrowed extensively from.

In March 2018, Conaway laid out the findings of a report by the Republican members of the House Intelligence Committee. One of the findings was that the committee had found no evidence of collusion between Russia and the Trump campaign in the 2016 election; Democrats on the committee said that they had come to no such conclusion. A few days later, Conaway walked back that finding, saying "Our committee was not charged with answering the collusion idea". Asked why the committee drew a conclusion if it had not investigated the matter, Conaway denied that the committee had drawn a conclusion, "What we said is we found no evidence of it. That’s a different statement. We found no evidence of collusion."

In December 2020, Conaway was one of 126 Republican members of the House of Representatives who signed an amicus brief in support of Texas v. Pennsylvania, a lawsuit filed at the United States Supreme Court contesting the results of the 2020 presidential election, in which Joe Biden prevailed over incumbent Donald Trump. The Supreme Court declined to hear the case on the basis that Texas lacked standing under Article III of the Constitution to challenge the results of the election held by another state.

Political campaigns
Conaway first ran for elective office in 2003, when he ran in a special election for the 19th Congressional District, which came open after 18-year Republican incumbent Larry Combest stepped down shortly after winning a 10th term. Conaway lost by 587 votes to fellow Republican Randy Neugebauer. A few months later, the Texas Legislature redrew the state's districts in an effort engineered by then-House Majority Leader Tom DeLay. Three brand-new districts were created, one of them being the 11th, which was based in Midland. Previously, Midland had been part of the Lubbock-based 19th District. DeLay was particularly keen to draw a district based in Midland, Odessa and the oil-rich Permian Basin in part because Texas House Speaker Tom Craddick was from that area. This district is heavily Republican – by some accounts, it was the most Republican district in Texas at the time.  Republicans had dominated every level of government since the 1980s, and usually garner 70 percent or more of the vote in this area (Glasscock County had voted 93 percent for Bush in 2000, the highest percentage of any county in the nation). The race was essentially over when Conaway announced his candidacy. He won in November with 77 percent of the vote, one of the largest percentages by anyone facing major-party opposition.

Conaway was reelected six times with no substantive opposition. The district is so heavily Republican that the Democrats only fielded a challenger against him three times in 2010, 2012 and 2018. Each time, he won at least 75 percent of the vote. He was reelected unopposed in 2006 and faced only minor party opposition in 2008, 2014, and 2016, all three of which times he won with roughly 90% of the vote.

Conaway won re-nomination to a sixth term in the U.S. House in the Republican primary held on March 4, 2014. He polled 53,107 votes (74 percent); his challenger, Wade Brown, received 18,979 votes (26 percent).

Conaway won re-election in the general election held on November 4, 2014. He polled 107,752 votes (90 percent); his challenger, Libertarian Ryan T. Lange, received 11,607 (10 percent).

Conaway announced in July 2019 that he would not be running for reelection.

Committee assignments
116th Congress
Committee on Agriculture (Ranking Member)
Committee on Armed Services
Committee on Intelligence

Personal life

Conaway served on the Midland Independent School District Board from 1985 to 1988.

Conaway is married to Suzanne Kidwell Conaway and their family includes two sons, two daughters, and seven grandchildren.

See also
Timeline of investigations into Trump and Russia (2019)

References

External links

 
 
 
 Profile at the Texas Tribune
 Mike Conaway: Lessons Learned in High School - Odessa Permian five-part series

|-

|-

|-

|-

1948 births
21st-century American politicians
Baptists from Texas
Living people
Military personnel from Texas
People from Borger, Texas
People from Midland, Texas
People from Odessa, Texas
Protestants from Texas
Republican Party members of the United States House of Representatives from Texas
School board members in Texas
Texas A&M University–Commerce alumni